"Third Time Lucky" is a song by Polish-born singer Basia released in 1994 on her third album The Sweetest Illusion. It was written and produced by Basia Trzetrzelewska and Danny White. The lyrics tell about drawing lessons from failed relationships and having hope for the next partner to be the ultimate.

"Third Time Lucky" served as the final single from The Sweetest Illusion and was remixed by Johnny Vicious. The single was a minor success on the UK Singles Chart. It received a positive review from the Music & Media magazine.

Music video

The music video for the song was directed by Nick Morris. It was filmed in Los Angeles, California during rehearsals and the performance at the Greek Theatre in July 1994. The clip also includes footage of streets of Los Angeles. In 2009, the video was released on a bonus DVD included in the special edition of Basia's album It's That Girl Again.

Track listings
CD single
 "Third Time Lucky" (Radio Edit) – 3:56
 "Third Time Lucky" (Instrumental) – 4:11
 "Drunk on Love" (Extended Dance Mix) – 7:50

CD single
 "Third Time Lucky" (Radio Edit) – 3:55
 "Drunk on Love" (Extended Dance Mix) – 7:45
 "Until You Come Back to Me" – 3:54
 "Third Time Lucky" (Instrumental) – 4:07

12" single
A. "Third Time Lucky" (Vokal Mix) – 9:45
B1. "Drunk on Love" (Roger's Ultimate Anthem Mix) – 8:51
B1. "Drunk on Love" (Hands in the Air Dub) – 5:56

Cassette single
A. "Third Time Lucky" (Radio Edit) – 3:55
B. "Third Time Lucky" (Instrumental) – 4:07

Charts

References

External links
 The official Basia website

1994 singles
1994 songs
Basia songs
Epic Records singles
Songs written by Basia
Songs written by Danny White (musician)